Montluçon is a commune in central France on the river Cher. It is the largest commune in the Allier department, although the department's prefecture is located in the smaller town of Moulins. Its inhabitants are known as Montluçonnais. The town is in the traditional province of Bourbonnais and was part of the mediaeval duchy of Bourbon.

Geography
Montluçon is located in the northwest of the Allier department near the frontier of the Centre-Val de Loire and Nouvelle-Aquitaine regions.

Montluçon is linked with surrounding regions and towns via four main road axes, plus the highway A71 from Orléans to Clermont-Ferrand; through a railway linking in the North Vierzon then Paris (3-5h). Formerly the canal de Berry linked Montluçon towards the north.

Montluçon is close to the Méridienne verte (an architectural project marking the Paris meridian) and to the Greenwich meridian.

Montluçon is also close to the geographic centre of Metropolitan France.

History

Early history
Montluçon was built in the Middle Ages. The first mention of a place called Monte Lucii (Mont de Lucius) dates from the eleventh century. Guillaume, son of Archambaud IV of Bourbon, built the castle in a defensible position on a small rocky hill on a bend in the river Cher.

The town, which formed part of the duchy of Bourbon, was taken by the English in 1171, and by Philip Augustus in 1181; the English were finally driven out in the 14th century.

In the 14th century, Louis II de Bourbon re-built the castle and walls. Montluçon and other Bourbon lands reverted to the French crown in 1529, and Henry IV further improved the defenses.

Montluçon became the administrative seat of the area in 1791, then entered the industrial era thanks to the presence of coalpits  distant in Commentry, the Canal de Berry in 1830 and the railway in 1864. These transport links allowed the import of ore and export of coal, wood and manufactured goods. The population grew from 5000 inhabitants in 1830 to 50 000 in 1950.

World War II
During the Second World War, the Germans occupied the Dunlop tyre plant (even though Montluçon was in the free zone) to exploit the research laboratory to synthesize rubber, since natural rubber could not be imported by Germany.  The manufacturing of tyres for Luftwaffe aircraft was also of interest for the Germans.

For this reason, the Allies bombed the site on 12–16 September 1943, as well as part of the nearby town Saint-Victor, causing 36 deaths and injuring more than 250 civilians.

A notable act of resistance occurred in the city on 6 January 1943 when a mob of citizens overran guards supervising a massive deportation of men to Germany in accordance with the Service de Travail Obligatoire (Obligatory Work Service) plan that sent able Frenchmen to fill vacancies in German factories during the war. All the men who were to be deported managed to escape into the countryside, evading the forced industrial service awaiting them in the Reich.

Post-World War II
Since 1945, traditional industry (blast furnaces and glassware) has declined.  Today Montluçon has chemical industries, tyre manufacture (Dunlop), and electronics (Sagem), and more recently a technopole at La Loue was established for high-tech companies.

New Zealand-born SOE agent Nancy Wake, the most decorated woman of World War II, led her small army of resistance fighters in the countryside around Montluçon. Wake died on 7 August 2011 aged 98, and on 11 March 2013, her ashes were scattered in a small wood outside Montluçon. The ceremony was followed by a civic reception in the town.

Population

Transportation

Air
There is a small airport  from Montluçon (Montluçon - Guéret Airport) with flights mainly for Paris, and a smaller aerodrome in Montluçon itself (Montluçon - Domérat Aerodrome).
The nearest international airports are Clermont-Ferrand Airport and Limoges Airport.

Road
Montluçon is linked to French and European road networks, by three major routes:
 the highway A71 from Orléans to Clermont-Ferrand.
 the national route to Clermont-Ferrand (E11) and to Bourges/Vierzon
 the E62/RN145 joining Limoges to Moulins

Rail 

The Gare de Montluçon-Ville railway station is served by three main passenger rail lines.
 'Montluçon - Bourges - Vierzon - Paris' (fastest travel time to Paris: 3h08)
 'Montluçon - Gannat - Clermont Ferrand'
 'Montluçon - Guéret - Saint-Sulpice-Laurière - Limoges' (on the Lyon-Bordeaux line)

City buses
Montluçon's local buses are run by Maelis.

Sights
The upper town, on the right bank of the Cher, consists of steep, narrow, winding streets, and preserves several buildings of the 15th and 16th centuries. The lower town, traversed by the Cher, is the industrial zone.

The church of Notre-Dame dates from the fourteenth century, the church of St Pierre partly from the 12th. The town hall, with a library, occupies the site of an old Ursuline convent, and two other convents are used as a college and hospital. Overlooking the town is the castle rebuilt by Louis II, Duke of Bourbon, and taken by Henry IV during the French Wars of Religion; it serves as a barracks.

Monuments

 The Dukes of the Bourbon castle in Montluçon, dating from the 13th and 14th centuries
 Church of Notre-Dame, XVe
 Church of Saint-Pierre, XIIe
 Church of Saint-Paul, XIXe
 Church of Sainte-Thérèse, XXe
 Church of Saint-Martin, XXe
 Church of Sainte-Jeanne d'Arc, built in 1966
 Temple de l'Église Réformée de France, (1888)
 Tour des forges (or 'tour fondue'), XIIe siècle
 Crown, XIIe
 Maison des Douze apôtres du XIIe
 Museum of popular musiques
 Town Hall, XIXe
 Ancienne chapelle Saint-Louis
 Passage du doyenné
 Castle la Louvière
 Castle de Bien-Assis
Canal de Berry: locks, canal bridge

Culture
 Musée des Musiques Populaires
 Théâtre Municipal Gabrielle Robinne

International relations

Montluçon is twinned with:
 Antsirabe, Madagascar
 Guimarães, Portugal
 Hagen, Germany
 Igualada, Spain
 Leszno, Poland

Miscellaneous
Administration:
Montluçon is a sub-prefecture and has courts, a board of trade arbitration, a chamber of commerce and several schools (general public, private, commercial).

Sport:
ÉDS Montluçon

Personalities

Montluçon was the birthplace of:
 Achille Allier (1807-1836), archaeologist and writer 
 Françoise Bonnet (born 1957), a long-distance runner and Olympic athlete
 Guy Chauvet (1933–2007), a tenor
 Jules Cluzel (born 1988), a motorcycle Grand Prix road racer
 Marx Dormoy (1888–1941), a politician
 Michael Fitzpatrick (born 1970), American musician, lead singer of Fitz and the Tantrums
 Jehan (born 1957), a songwriter
 Jean-Daniel Lafond, spouse of former Governor General of Canada, Michaelle Jean.
 Louis Alexis Étienne Bonvin (1886-1946) Governor General of French India between 1938 and 1946
 André Messager (1853–1929), a composer
  (born 1977), a mixed martial arts fighter
 Gabrielle Robinne (1886-1980), a stage and film actress
 Florian Vachon (born 1985), a professional road bicycle racer
 Jean Val Jean (born 1980), an adult film actor
 Bernadette Vergnaud (born 1950), a French politician and Member of the European Parliament
 Roger Walkowiak (1927-2017), a cyclist, winner of the 1956 Tour de France

See also
Communes of the Allier department

References

External links

  

 
Communes of Allier
Subprefectures in France
Bourbonnais